Turks in Kyrgyzstan are ethnic Turks who live in Kyrgyzstan.

History 
The majority of Turks were deported from south-western Georgia to Central Asia in 1944, where they were employed largely in the agricultural sector in grain and livestock production. Of the 207,500 Meskhetian Turks registered in the 1989 Soviet census, there were 21,294 Turks in Kyrgyzstan.

Demographics 
Turks in Kyrgyzstan are often called Fergana Turks due to their large presence in the Fergana valley.

Education 
The Kyrgyz-Turkish Manas University was established in Jal district of Bishkek in 1995 and has around 2,000 students. It is one of the leading universities in the country. The Kyrgyz-Turkish Anatolian High School, Kyrgyz-Turkish Anatolian Girls Vocational School, Bishkek Turkish Primary School and Turkish Language Teaching Center are run by the Turkish Ministry of Education.

Notable people
Ömürbek Babanov, Prime Minister of Kyrgyzstan in 2011-12 (Turkish Meskhetian mother)
Orhan İnandı, founder of the Sapat system of schools in Kyrgyzstan, including Ala-Too International University

See also 
Turks in the former Soviet Union
Turkic Council

References

Bibliography 
 
.

.
.

External links 
Soviet Census 1970: Kyrgyzstan
Soviet Census 1979: Kyrgyzstan
Soviet Census 1989: Kyrgyzstan

Kyrgyzstan
Kyrgyzstan
Ethnic groups in Kyrgyzstan